Chromodoris boucheti is a species of colourful sea slug, a dorid nudibranch, a marine gastropod mollusc in the family Chromodorididae.

Etymology
This species is named after the malacologist Philippe Bouchet.

Distribution
This species was described from the Northern entrance to Longogoni Passage, Mayotte, Comoro Islands, Indian Ocean. It is distributed on the East African coast from Tanzania to South Africa and in the Indian Ocean from the Maldives to Indonesia.

Description
Chromodoris boucheti can reach a length of 30–50 mm. The upper surface of the body is bluish white, with longitudinal black lines and yellow rhinophores. The lower half of the gills is white, the upper half is yellow. Moreover, this species shows characteristic black markings running up from the base on the inside and outside edge of its gills. The inner black marking is quite pronounced. It is similar in colour pattern to Chromodoris elisabethina and Chromodoris lochi.

Habitat
This species can be found on the coral reefs to depths of 35 meters.

References

Chromodorididae
Gastropods described in 1982